This article lists the winners and nominees for the NAACP Image Award for Outstanding Music Video. Currently Alicia Keys holds the record for most wins in this category with five.

Winners and nominees
Winners are listed first and highlighted in bold.

1990s

2000s

2010s

2020s

Multiple wins and nominations

Wins

 5 wins
 Alicia Keys

 2 wins
 Whitney Houston
 Michael Jackson
 R. Kelly
 Will Smith
 Beyoncé

Nominations

 12 nominations
 Alicia Keys
 Beyoncé

 5 nominations
 Bruno Mars
 Mary J. Blige
 Janet Jackson
 Michael Jackson
 India Arie

 3 nominations
 R. Kelly
 H.E.R.
 Kendrick Lamar
 John Legend
 Maxwell
 TLC
 Usher
 Kanye West
 Aaliyah
 Whitney Houston

 2 nominations
 Erykah Badu
 Common
 Jennifer Hudson
 Kem
 Ledisi
 Lizzo
 Tobe Nwigwe
 Outkast
 Jill Scott
 Will Smith
 Pharrell Williams

References

NAACP Image Awards
American music video awards